The Bahrain Freedom Movement is a London-based Bahraini opposition group which has its headquarters in a north London mosque. Its main medium is the Voice of Bahrain website which was blocked for several years by Batelco, Bahrain's sole Internet service provider, on orders from the Ministry of Information.

The BFM played a leading role in the 1990s uprising in Bahrain.

It is led by Said Al Shehabi, who was formerly a member of Bahrain's main Shi'a Islamist party, Al Wefaq Islamic National Society but resigned along with several other members in September 2005 after it ended its boycott of parliamentary elections. Shehabi is a columnist with the London-based Arab newspaper, Al Quds Al Arabi.

The Bahrain government's political reforms in 2001 saw two of the BFM's most prominent leaders leave the movement. Under the reforms, all exiles were invited to return to Bahrain to participate in the political process, and leading members returned to their homeland. Although all of its members have received political amnesties and most have returned to Bahrain to participate in the political process, several have remained in London where they hold the status of asylum seekers.

On March 7, 2011, Al Shehabi alongside Hasan Mushaima, the leader of the Haq movement and Abdulwahab Hussain, the leader of the Wafa movement, formed the "Coalition for the Republic", calling for an overthrow of the Sunni government, because of the crackdown in February during the Bahraini uprising of 2011.

See also
 1990s uprising in Bahrain
 Politics of Bahrain

External links
 Video: Bahrain – The Story of Constitutional Uprising
 Carlton TV documentary about Bahrain Uprising
 Channel 4 video of Bahrain Uprising

References

Bahraini uprising of 2011
Islamic organisations based in the United Kingdom
Islamist groups
National liberation movements
Political parties in Bahrain
Republicanism in Bahrain
1982 establishments in the United Kingdom
Political parties established in 1982
Organizations of the Arab Spring
Political opposition organizations
Organizations designated as terrorist by Bahrain